Benso is a surname. Notable people with the surname include:

Camillo Benso, conte di Cavour (1810–1861), leading figure in the movement toward Italian unification
Giulio Benso (1592–1668), Genovese painter of the early Baroque

See also
Benso Oil Palm Plantation, Ghanaian oil palm plantation and company, based at the Adum Banso Estate in Takoradi
Benson (surname)